State elections were held in South Australia on 3 May 1902 following the dissolution of both houses. All 42 seats in the South Australian House of Assembly were up for election, and all 18 seats in the Legislative Council. The House had a reduction of 12 seats compared to the previous election. The Council was reduced from 6 members in each of four districts to 6 members from Central District and four from each of North-Eastern, Northern and Southern Districts. The incumbent liberal government led by Premier of South Australia John Jenkins in an informal coalition with the conservatives defeated the United Labor Party (ULP) led by Thomas Price. Each of the 13 districts elected multiple members, with voters casting multiple votes.

Background
Following the 1899 election, Charles Kingston tried again for franchise reform. The Assembly voted against the measure and Kingston resigned his ministry. He was replaced by Vaiben Louis Solomon for a brief period of seven days, until Frederick Holder formed a government which, for the first time, included a ULP member, Lee Batchelor.

The parliament was transformed by the impact of federation. Seven leading members of the Assembly resigned and were elected to the Parliament of Australia. As a result, there were 11 by-elections in this period. The Assembly was reduced in numbers, from 54 to 42. A redistribution was carried out following these changes, to produce a chamber elected from 13 districts - one 5-member, two four-member, nine 3-member and one 2-member electorates. The election was a "new start" for the parliament.

There was no "Liberal" or "Kingston" party, but there was a relatively cohesive Kingston group among both independent members and candidates. The Liberal and Democratic Union would not be formed until the 1906 election.

Results

See also
Members of the South Australian House of Assembly, 1902–1905
Members of the South Australian Legislative Council, 1902–1905

References

History of South Australian elections 1857-2006, volume 1: ECSA
Statistical Record of the Legislature 1836-2007: SA Parliament
State and federal election results in Australia since 1890

External links
The 13 electorates from 1902 to 1915: The Adelaide Chronicle

Elections in South Australia
1902 elections in Australia
1900s in South Australia
May 1902 events